The 2001–02 Iowa State Cyclones men's basketball team represents Iowa State University during the 2001–02 NCAA Division I men's basketball season. The Cyclones were coached by Larry Eustachy, who was in his 4th season. They played their home games at Hilton Coliseum in Ames, Iowa and competed in the Big 12 Conference.

Previous season

They finished the season 25-6, 13-3 in Big 12 play to finish in first place.  They lost to Baylor in the quarterfinals of the Big 12 Conference tournament.  They received an at-large bid to the NCAA tournament where they were upset by Hampton.

Incoming players

Roster

Schedule and results

|-
!colspan=12 style=""|Exhibition

|-

|-
!colspan=12 style=""|Regular Season

|-

|-

|-

|-

|-

|-

|-

|-

|-

|-

|-

|-

|-

|-

|-

|-

|-

|-

|-

|-

|-

|-

|-

|-

|-

|-

|-

|-

|-

|-
!colspan=12 style=""|Big 12 Tournament

|-

Awards and honors

All-Conference Selections
Tyrary Pearson (2nd Team)
Jake Sullivan (3rd Team)
Shane Power (Honorable Mention)

 Academic All-Big 12 First Team

Jake Sullivan (2002)

Ralph A. Olsen Award

Tyray Pearson (2002)

References

Iowa State Cyclones men's basketball seasons
Iowa State
Iowa State Cyc
Iowa State Cyc